The 2019 Mixco mayoral election will be held on 16 June 2019.

The elections will be held next to the presidential, legislative, municipal and Central American Parliament elections.

The current mayor Ernest "Neto" Steve Bran, elected by the Reform Movement (now called Podemos), is running for re-election with Todos party.

Results

References

Elections in Guatemala